is team up crossover, film featuring Gekiranger vs Boukenger. It was directed by Noboru Takemoto and written by Naruhisa Arakawa. The film was released on March 14, 2008. It is the first team-up to be in wide-screen, appropriate as Boukenger and Gekiranger were the first Sentai series to be themselves shown in wide-screen.

Plot
Dark Shadow's Shizuka of the Wind sneaks into SCRTC to steal a mysterious red jewel, leading to the Gekirangers confronting her. When BoukenBlack, BoukenYellow, and BoukenBlue appear, a battle among the two groups over the jewel occurs at Shizuka attempts to retreat until BoukenSilver retrieves from her. However, Satoru Akashi arrives and takes the jewel to his former teammates' dismay. While this occurred, Sakura goes after the blue jewel in the Rin Jū Hall, and with Satoru, they battle Rio and Mere, who join them soon after to gain the power that the Cosmic Kenpō style offers. The Gekirangers and Boukengers head to South America where they race towards the Darkness Pathway ruins as Bouken Silver, Geki Violet, and Geki Chopper battle Rin Jū Hippotamus-Ken Bākā. But once at the top, after they're too late to stop the villains from getting to the Cosmic Kenpō's secrets, Akashi reveals that Sakura was actually possessed by Pachacamac's descendant, the evil , who uses his power to turn Rio, Mere, and Bākā into his pawns. The Gekirangers and Boukengers team up to free Rio and Mere before all 13 stop Pachacamac XII in an epic battle on the moon.

Cast
 Hiroki Suzuki as Jyan Kandou
 Mina Fukui as Ran Uzaki
 Manpei Takagi as Retu Fukami
 Riki Miura as Gou Fukami
 Sotaro as Ken Hisatsu 
 Yuka Hirata as Mele 
 Hirofumi Araki as Rio
 Mitsuomi Takahashias Satoru Akashi
 Yasuka Saito as Masumi Inou
 Masashi Mikami as Souta Mogami 
 Chise Nakamura as Natsuki Mamiya
 Haruka Suenaga as Sakura Nishihori
 Masayuki Deai as Eiji Takaoka
 Kazue Itoh as Miki Masaki
 Naoki Kawano as Long
 Mami Yamasaki as Shizuka
 Shigeru Saiki as Morio Makino

Voice cast
 Ichirô Nagai as Master Xia Fu
 Akira Ishida as Bae
 Hideyuki Hori as DaiKenjin Zubaan
 Yuji Kishi as Baka
 Shoma Kai as Bruce E

Theme Song

Opening theme
"Juken Sentai Gekiranger" (獣拳戦隊ゲキレンジャー Jūken Sentai Gekirenjā?)
Lyrics: Neko Oikawa
Composition: Takafumi Iwasaki
Arrangement: Seiichi Kyōda
Artist: Takayoshi Tanimoto with Young Fresh on chorus

Ending theme
"Tao" (道（タオ） Tao?)
Lyrics: Shoko Fujibayashi
Composition: Katsuki Maeda (前田 克樹 Maeda Katsuki?)
Arrangement: Kazunori Miyake (三宅 一徳 Miyake Kazunori?)
Artist: Ichirou Mizuki with Young Fresh (Chorus)

References

2000s Super Sentai films
Crossover tokusatsu films